Adinarayana Hosahalli is a village in the southern state of Karnataka, India. It is located in the Doddaballapur taluk of Bangalore Rural district in Karnataka. The village is well known with its nickname A N Hosahalli. The village is nearly 5 km from Doddaballapura. 

The village has 72 families and the population is roughly around 270 people. A N Hosahalli shares its border with Nagadenahalli to the North West, Alur Duddanahalli to North East, Moparahalli to the West and Obadenahalli to the South East. 

Major Cast: Vokkaliga, Dhobi, SC (Adhi Karnataka).

Occupation: Agriculture is the main occupation. Animal husbandry is the main source of economy of the people. The Karnataka Industrial Area Development Board (KIADB) Phase I, II and III coming up near the village will be a boon for the village youth.

See also
 Bangalore Rural
 Districts of Karnataka

References

Doddaballapura Taluk